German National Assembly may refer to:

 Frankfurt Parliament during the German revolutions of 1848–49
 Weimar National Assembly after the German Revolution of 1918–19 at the end of World War I